Womochel Peaks are low rock peaks about 2 nautical miles (3.7 km) south of Mount Weihaupt in the Outback Nunataks. Mapped by United States Geological Survey (USGS) from surveys and U.S. Navy air photos, 1959–64. Named by Advisory Committee on Antarctic Names (US-ACAN) for Daniel R. Womochel, biologist at McMurdo Station, 1967–68.

Mountains of Victoria Land
Pennell Coast